Bären Twann is a traditional inn founded in 1526 and located in Twann, Bern canton, Switzerland.

The hotel runs the 4th generation of the family Aeschlimann and visitors can see views of the nearby Lake Biel.

See also 
List of oldest companies

References

External links 
Homepage
Facebook page

Hotels in Switzerland
Restaurants in Switzerland
Companies established in the 15th century
16th-century establishments in Switzerland